Egor Antropov (born May 8, 1992) is a Russian professional ice hockey defenceman. He is currently playing with Piráti Chomutov of the Czech Extraliga (ELH).

Playing career
Antropov made his Kontinental Hockey League debut playing with Admiral Vladivostok during the 2013–14 season. In August 2014 he signed a one-year deal with HC Neftekhimik Nizhnekamsk.

Antropov as a free agent secured a one-year contract in a return to his original KHL club, Admiral Vladivostok, on August 7, 2018. In the following 2018–19 season, Antropov contributed just 1 goal in 17 games for Admiral, before opting to leave the KHL and signing a month long trial for Piráti Chomutov of the ELH on December 22, 2018.

References

External links

1992 births
Living people
Admiral Vladivostok players
HC Neftekhimik Nizhnekamsk players
Piráti Chomutov players
Russian ice hockey defencemen
Severstal Cherepovets players
Ice hockey people from Moscow
Russian expatriate ice hockey people
Russian expatriate sportspeople in the Czech Republic
Expatriate ice hockey players in the Czech Republic
Russian expatriate sportspeople in Kazakhstan
Expatriate ice hockey players in Kazakhstan
Yertis Pavlodar players
Chelmet Chelyabinsk players
THK Tver players
Rubin Tyumen players
Omskie Yastreby players
HC Vityaz players